Peter B. Olsen (April 11, 1848 – July 3, 1926) was an American newspaper editor and politician.

Olsen was born in Christiana, Norway. Olsen emigrated to the United States in 1872. He was a printer by trade and became the literary editor for the Skandinaven in Chicago, Illinois. From 1899 to 1903, Olsen served as a Republican representative in the Illinois House of Representatives. From 1900 to 1906, Olsen served as the Clerk of Cook County, Illinois. Olsen died at a hospital in Chicago, Illinois. Olsen was a close associate of fellow Chicago politician Henry L. Hertz.

Notes

Related reading

Larson, Laurence M. (1937) Skandinaven, Professor Anderson, and the Yankee School ( Northfield, MN:  The Changing West and Other Essays, pages 116–146)
Øverland, Orm (1996) The Western Home - A Literary History of Norwegian America (Northfield, MN: Norwegian-American Historical Association)

1848 births
1926 deaths
Norwegian emigrants to the United States
Politicians from Chicago
Editors of Illinois newspapers
County officials in Illinois
Republican Party members of the Illinois House of Representatives